The City Waites is a British early music ensemble. Formed in the early 1970s, they specialise in English music of the 16th and 17th centuries from the street, tavern, theatre and countryside — the music of ordinary people. They endeavour to appeal to a wide general audience as well as to scholars. They have toured the UK, much of Europe, the Middle East, the Far East and the USA, performing everywhere from major concert halls and universities to village squares. Collaborations include the National Theatre, the Royal Shakespeare Company and Shakespeare's Globe. They can be heard on several movie and TV soundtracks; they broadcast frequently and have made more than 30 CDs.

Performers

Lucie Skeaping 

Lucie Skeaping sings and plays the baroque violin. She is also founder-director of the Burning Bush, a band which explores klezmer (traditional Jewish music) as well as Arab-influenced music (another member of the band, Robin Jeffrey, plays Middle Eastern instruments). She presents BBC Radio 3's Early Music Show and other programmes which showcase early music ensembles of the UK and other countries. She has written the award-winning school book Let's Make Tudor Music and her "Musical Mystery Tour" visits numerous schools each year. Her many CDs include Home Sweet Home (with Ian Partidge), a celebration of 19th century parlour music, and English National Songs. Her book Broadside Ballads won the Music Industry Award for Best Classical Music Publication 2006. Her latest publication is Who Gave Thee Thy Jolly Red Nose?, an anthology of recorder music.

Douglas Wootton 
Douglas Wootton is one of the few tenors who accompany themselves on the lute. He also plays bandora, cittern, and tabor. Due to his promotion of the band they were voted the second-best Folk Band of the Year in the pages of Melody Maker. His down-to-earth approach sets the tone for the band. He also writes musicals for children.

Roddy Skeaping
Roddy Skeaping was involved in the Early Music revival from its earliest days, working with the Academy of Ancient Music, David Munrow's Early Music Consort and the Consort of Musicke. He was appointed Leverhulme Research Fellow at the Royal College of Music where he also taught the viola da gamba. As a composer he creates all the group's musical arrangements and has also written scores for the Royal National Theatre, Shakespeare's Globe, the Royal Shakespeare Company and several historical feature films.

Nicholas Perry
Nicholas Perry trained as a horn player at the Guildhall School of Music going on to study instrument making as a Crafts Council apprentice. He has performed and recorded for many London-based early music ensembles including the Gabrieli Consort, the English Baroque Soloists. The Taverner Consort and His Majesty’s Sagbutts and Cornetts. He is a regular player at Shakespeare’s Globe and the Royal Shakespeare Company and continues to work as an early brass instrument maker. He is currently the UK’s only professional serpent leatherer.

Michael Brain 
Michael Brain plays curtal, baroque bassoon, recorder, oboe and sings. He was a chorister at Westminster Abbey. He is related to the horn player Dennis Brain. On stage he gives spirited descriptions of how the instruments are constructed. He also works as a plumber.

Former members 

The Skeapings and/or Douglas Wootton have been core of a constantly changing line-up. Musicians who have worked with the group previously include:

Joe Skeaping - violin
Keith Thompson - woodwind
Barbara Grant - soprano, violin
Nicholas Hayley - bass viol
Robin Jeffrey - lute
Richard Wistreich - baritone
Graham Wells - woodwinds

Discography 
 The English Stage Jig (Hyperion) - released March 9
 The English Tradition (ARC)
 Low and Lusty Ballads (Regis)
 Penny Merriments (Naxos)
 Bawdy Ballads of Old England (Regis, 1995) formerly the Mufitians of Grope Lane (Musica Oscura)
 Christmas Now is Drawing Near (Saydisc) CD-SDL 371
 How the World Wags (Hyperion, 1981) A 66008
 Pills to Purge Melancholy (Saydisc, 1990) CD-SDL 382
 The Music of the Tudor Age
 Music of the Middle Ages
 Music of the Stuart Age 
 Music from the Time of Henry VIII 
 Music from the Time of Charles II
 A Madrigal for All Seasons

On LP
 The City Waites (Decca, 1976) SKL 5264
 A Gorgeous Gallery of Gallant Inventions (EMI, 1974) EMC 3017

References

External links
 Official Website
 Lucy Skeaping website:

Mixed early music groups
British early music ensembles
Musical groups established in the 1970s
Musical groups from London